Vaccinium microcarpum is a species of flowering plant belonging to the family Ericaceae.

Its native range is subarctic to Temperate Northern Hemisphere.

References

microcarpum